Malden Historic District is a national historic district located within the town of Malden, located in Kanawha County, West Virginia.

Description
The district includes 95 contributing buildings.  It includes residential, commercial, ecclesiastical, and industrial buildings dated as early as the 1830s.

Notable buildings include the Richard E. Putney House (1836), Kanawha Salines Presbyterian Church (1840), and J. Q. Dickinson & Company building. Located within the district is the separately listed African Zion Baptist Church.

The Malden Historic District was listed on the National Register of Historic Places in 1980.

References

External links

All of the following documented historic buildings are located in Malden, Kanawha County, West Virginia:

Historic districts in Kanawha County, West Virginia
Historic districts on the National Register of Historic Places in West Virginia
National Register of Historic Places in Kanawha County, West Virginia
Buildings and structures in Kanawha County, West Virginia
Federal architecture in West Virginia
Victorian architecture in West Virginia
Historic American Buildings Survey in West Virginia